Christian Zell (or Zelle) (c. 1683 – 13 April 1763) was a German harpsichord maker.

He was probably a pupil of harpsichord maker Michael Mietke. The first mention of him is in 1722 in the register of citizens of Hamburg, the city where he was to spend the rest of his life. In that year, he took over the workshop of instrument maker Carl Conrad Fleischer after marrying his widow; they had three children.

There are three of his harpsichords surviving: a 1728 instrument in the Museum für Kunst und Gewerbe Hamburg; a 1737 instrument in the Museu de la Música de Barcelona; and a 1741 instrument in the Museum of the Organeum in Weener, Lower Saxony. They are noted for the richness of their decoration, with lacquered chinoiserie typical of Hamburg harpsichords, and most significantly, their 'matchless tone'.

The harpsichord played by American singer-songwriter Tori Amos on her 1996 album Boys For Pele and the subsequent Dew Drop Inn Tour is a replica of the 1728 Christian Zell harpsichord although without the elaborate paintings. It was made by  Robert Goble & Son.

See also
 List of historical harpsichord makers

Notes and sources

 Alexander Pilipczuk: "Zell [Zelle], Christian", Grove Music Online ed. L. Macy (Accessed 18 May 2007), http://www.grovemusic.com/

1683 births
1763 deaths
German musical instrument makers
Harpsichord makers